Dennis Brian Browne is a Canadian former diplomat. He was Ambassador Extraordinary and Plenipotentiary to Sweden.

External links 
 Foreign Affairs and International Trade Canada Complete List of Posts 

Year of birth missing (living people)
Living people
Ambassadors of Canada to Sweden